Barilius signicaudus is a species of fish in the family Cyprinidae. It is found in Khwae Noi River and Khwae Yai River from Mae Klong River.

References

Fish of Thailand
Fish described in 2012